The pectoral antwren (Herpsilochmus pectoralis) is a species of bird in the family Thamnophilidae. It is endemic to north east Brazil. Its natural habitats are subtropical or tropical dry forests and subtropical or tropical moist lowland forests. It is locally common within its range, but has a highly fragmented distribution. It is threatened by habitat loss.

The  pectoral antwren was originally described by the English zoologist Philip Sclater in 1857 and given its current binomial name Herpsilochmus pectoralis.

References

External links
BirdLife Species Factsheet.

pectoral antwren
Birds of the Caatinga
Endemic birds of Brazil
pectoral antwren
pectoral antwren
Taxonomy articles created by Polbot